Trondhjem Station (original spelling: Throndhjem), sometimes called Kalvskinnet to distinguish it from Trondheim Central Station on Brattøra. Kalvskinnet was the first central railway station in Trondheim, Norway. It opened on 5 August 1864 as the terminal station of the narrow gauge Trondhjem–Støren Line. The station was designed by Georg Andreas Bull, and still exists as one of the world's northernmost synagogues, after it was replaced by Trondheim Central Station in 1884 to become Trondheim Synagogue.

External links
Entry at the Norwegian Railway Club

References

Railway stations in Trondheim
Railway stations on the Røros Line
Railway stations opened in 1864
1864 establishments in Norway
Disused railway stations in Norway